Kagiso Rathebe (born 26 October 1992) is a South African actor and model. After graduating from The Market Theatre Laboratory, Kagiso has gone on to star on shows such as How To Ruin Christmas, Spoorloos and Noughts & Crosses. He is best known for his role as Amo on Scandal!

References

External links 
GQ Exclusive- Kagiso Rathebe talks about acting and his role on e.tv's Scandal!

Kagiso Rathebe by Times Live
Kagiso Rathebe by Youth Village
Kagiso Rathebe by safrolebs
Kagiso Rathebe by iol
Kagiso Rathebe by okmzansi

1992 births
Living people
Male actors from Johannesburg